Dinka (born Tamara Hunkeler on 24 June; also known as Tamara Maria Kler) is a Swiss DJ from Lucerne. She performs progressive house music with elements of world music, which she describes as "Multicultural Dance Music".

After coming in contact with Above & Beyond, who appreciated her music, Tamara signed with their label, Anjunabeats. She also earned a deal with A State of Trance, a subsidiary of Dutch DJ Armin van Buuren's Armada Music. In September 2012, she reached #2 at the Billboard Next Big Sound chart.

Her stage name comes from the Dinka people from South Sudan. When asked for the reason she chose such a name, she commented:

Discography 
Studio albums
 2008 Temptation
 2010 Hotel Summerville
 2011 Tales of the Sun

Singles / EPs 
 2007 "The Sin"
 2007 "The Temptation"
 2008 "Chemistry"
 2008 "Wildfire"
 2008 "Native"
 2008 "Autumn Leaves" (with Chris Reece)
 2008 "Asylum"
 2009 "Temptation" (Vandit Records)
 2009 "Canonball"
 2009 "Green Leaf" (feat. Lizzie Curious)
 2009 "Civilisation / Zero Altitute" 
 2009 "Eyelash"
 2009 "Elements"
 2009 "Scarlet"
 2010 "Elements - Remixes" (inkl. EDX Remix)
 2010 "Soma Is Language" (with George F. Zimmer)
 2010 "Some People Will Never Learn"
 2010 "Aircraft"
 2010 "Camouflage"
 2010 "Hive"
 2010 "Hive - The Remixes" (includes Stan Kolev Remix)
 2010 "Violet"
 2011 "Luminal" (with Stan Kolev)
 2011 "Violet (The Remixes)"
 2011 "On The Beach"
 2011 "The Sleeping Beauty"
 2011 "Reach For Me" (feat. Hadley & Danny Inzerillo)
 2011 "SkyScraper"
 2011 "White Christmas"
 2012 Purple EP
 2012 "Chariots" (with Leventina)
 2012 Innocence EP
 2012 "Lotus"
 2012 "Radiate" (feat. Julie Thompson)
 2012 Polarity EP
 2012 "Inseparable" (feat. Angelika Vee)
 2013 "Elements" (Reload 2013) mit Leventina
 2013 "Closer"
 2013 "Waterproof"
 2014 "Not Okay"
 2015 "Breath"
 2015 "Ueberflieger" (with Atlantis Ocean)

References

External links
 

Swiss house musicians
Swiss DJs
Living people
People from Lucerne
Progressive house
Women DJs
Electronic dance music DJs
Year of birth missing (living people)
Monstercat Silk artists